Dayamir Union is a union council under Osmani Nagar Upazila of Sylhet District, Bangladesh. It is the native home of General M. A. G. Osmani, who was the supreme commander of the Bangladesh Liberation War.

Villages
Khagdior
Dawlatpur
Raghavpur
Kauwarai
Khalpar
Khapon
Kharai
Raikdara
Muhammadpur
Chintamoni
Chonditiyor
Ahmadnagar
Mondolkapon
Keshorpur
Dhakur Mahal
Ataullah
Khatupur
Nij Korua
Little Dhirarai
Dayamir
Ranagalpur
Mirpara
Shonir Gaon
Ghoshgaon
Hussain Namki
Shorishpur
Shonyashi Para
Mirdar Chowk
Tazpur
Radhakona
Kaiyakair
Shirazpur
Kabari Para
Aalapur
Parkul
Sowar Gaon
Khondaker Bazar
Mirar Gaon
Khairpur
Boro Dhirarai
Alampur
Khanchanpur
Chowkh Ataullah
Ashrafpur

References

Unions of Osmani Nagar Upazila